A bone-seeking radioisotope is a radioactive substance that is given through a vein, and collects in bone cells and in tumor cells that have spread to the bone. It kills cancer cells by giving off low-level radiation.

References 
 Bone-seeking radioisotope entry in the public domain NCI Dictionary of Cancer Terms

Radiation therapy